The women's discus throw event at the 2002 World Junior Championships in Athletics was held in Kingston, Jamaica, at National Stadium on 18 and 19 July.

Medalists

Results

Final
19 July

Qualifications
18 Jul

Group A

Participation
According to an unofficial count, 16 athletes from 13 countries participated in the event.

References

Discus throw
Discus throw at the World Athletics U20 Championships